Typhales is a botanical name for an order of flowering plants. In the Cronquist system the name was used for an order placed in the subclass Commelinidae. The order consisted of (1981):

 order Typhales
 family Sparganiaceae
 family Typhaceae

The APG IV system, used here, assigns the plants involved to the order Poales.

Historically recognized angiosperm orders